Lukashevka is a rural locality (a village) in Dichnyansky Selsoviet Rural Settlement, Kurchatovsky District, Kursk Oblast, Russia. Population:

Geography 
The village is located in the Dichnya River basin (a tributary of the Seym River), 38 km south-west of Kursk, 5.5 km east of the district center – the town Kurchatov, 6.5 km from the selsoviet center – Dichnya.

 Climate
Lukashevka has a warm-summer humid continental climate (Dfb in the Köppen climate classification).

Transport 
Lukashevka is located 28 km from the federal route  Crimea Highway, 5 km from the road of regional importance  (Kursk – Lgov – Rylsk – border with Ukraine), 2.5 km from the road  (M2 – Ivanino), on the road of intermunicipal significance  (38K-017 – Lukashevka), 4.5 km from the nearest railway halt 428 km (railway line Lgov I — Kursk).

The rural locality is situated 45 km from Kursk Vostochny Airport, 123 km from Belgorod International Airport and 246 km from Voronezh Peter the Great Airport.

References

Notes

Sources

Rural localities in Kurchatovsky District, Kursk Oblast